Anna McCune Harper (née Anna Virginia McCune, July 2, 1902 – June 14, 1999) was a female tennis player from the U.S. She won the mixed doubles title at Wimbledon in 1931 partnering George Lott. She was the runner-up in singles at the 1930 U.S. Championships, losing to Betty Nuthall. She also was the runner-up in women's doubles at the 1928, 1930, and 1932 U.S. Championships and in mixed doubles at the 1931 edition of these championships.

Harper was ranked in the U.S. top 10 on five consecutive years from 1928 through 1932 and was top ranked in 1930.

Biography 
In 1924, she graduated Phi Beta Kappa from the University of California, Berkeley, where she joined the sorority Sigma Kappa. In 1925, she married Lawrence Averell Harper, a history professor at Berkeley. Through the following years, she ranked in the U.S. top 10 players, including 1930 when she ranked at the best player.

In 1932, Harper was called home because of an illness in her family. She then decided to give up tournament tennis for other tasks, including raising her three children, but continued to follow the game and played for many years.

Harper served as the national president of her sorority Sigma Kappa from 1939 to 1942.

Harper was inducted into the Cal Athletic Hall of Fame in 1981.

Around 1983, she had arthroscopic knee surgery at age 81 so she could continue to play. An adverse reaction to a general anesthetic sidelined her for good and then precipitated a slow decline in her health. Harper is buried in Mountain View Cemetery in Oakland, California.

Grand Slam finals

Singles : 1 runner-up

Doubles : 2 runners-up

Mixed doubles : 1 title, 1 runner-up

Grand Slam singles tournament timeline

See also 
 Performance timelines for all female tennis players who reached at least one Grand Slam final

References

External links
 

1902 births
1999 deaths
American female tennis players
People from Contra Costa County, California
Tennis people from California
Wimbledon champions (pre-Open Era)
Grand Slam (tennis) champions in mixed doubles
Sportspeople from Santa Barbara, California
20th-century American women
20th-century American people